Nicole Büchler (born 17 December 1983) is a Swiss former pole vaulter.

Achievements

External links
 

1983 births
Living people
Swiss female pole vaulters
Olympic athletes of Switzerland
Athletes (track and field) at the 2008 Summer Olympics
Athletes (track and field) at the 2012 Summer Olympics
Athletes (track and field) at the 2016 Summer Olympics
World Athletics Championships athletes for Switzerland
Universiade medalists in athletics (track and field)
Universiade silver medalists for Switzerland
Universiade bronze medalists for Switzerland
Medalists at the 2009 Summer Universiade
Competitors at the 2005 Summer Universiade
Medalists at the 2007 Summer Universiade